Volumnia is a character in Shakespeare's Coriolanus

Volumnia may also refer to:

Volumnia (wife of Coriolanus), historical person in ancient Rome
Volumnia gens, ancient Roman family
Volumnia, former genus of beetle:
Volumnia apicalis ,  now known as Glenea apicalis
Volumnia leucomelaena , now known as Glenea morosa
Volumnia Cytheris, slave in Ancient Rome
Volumnia Dedlock, character in Dickens' Bleak House